Warhammer 40,000: Dawn of War – Soulstorm is the third expansion to the real-time strategy video game Warhammer 40,000: Dawn of War, developed by Iron Lore Entertainment. Like its predecessors, Soulstorm is based on Games Workshop's tabletop wargame Warhammer 40,000, and introduces a multitude of new features to the Dawn of War series, including two new playable factions in the form of the Imperial Sisters of Battle and the Dark Eldar. It is a stand-alone game and does not need the original Dawn of War disc to run, but players must have the prior games installed and valid cd-keys in order to play as anything but the two new factions online.

Gameplay
Gameplay features real-time strategy interaction.  Game operation is similar to previous Warhammer titles, except for the new aerial units that do not follow these rules, and new campaign gameplay features.

Each race is given a new aerial unit that does not obey the normal rule of engagement in the Dawn of War series. These units are mostly specialists in engaging and destroying enemy vehicles and/or infantry.

As with its predecessor Dark Crusade, Soulstorm features a "meta-campaign" featuring 31 territories spread over four planets and three moons.

One difference, however, is that unlike Dark Crusade, there are no persistent bases. Once the player conquers a province, the base structures the player has built up will not be present in future conflicts. This can be remedied by reinforcing provinces with buildings and units in between battles, or by establishing a forward base using the Sisters of Battle army ability. Each Stronghold has a unique ability, each race starts with that ability.

Another difference is that the strength of an attacking enemy army is no longer based on strength of province they're attacking from, but their army size.

Multiplayer
Multiplayer remains the same as in previous titles, with players given the ability to either play via LAN or on the GameSpy network. A new 'medal' system has been added that provides rewards for certain player milestones (5-to-1 kill ratio, etc.), but there is no means of viewing the complete collection of medals a player has earned. It is assumed this problem will be addressed when an official patch is released along with other various bug fixes and corrections to the game, such as the current issue restricting certain masses of players from joining online multiplayer games.

Plot
The Kaurava conflict began after a sudden appearance of a Warp Storm near Kaurava IV. Previously, the system was held entirely by the Imperium of Mankind and defended by the Imperial Guard, except for two areas—the Ork infested jungles of Kaurava II and the underground of Kaurava III, holding Necron tombs in hibernation. The warp storm leads to the awakening of the Necrons, and the arrival of Ork warboss Gorgutz, who absorbs the indigenous Orks with his own forces. Six other factions appear in the system. The Eldar under the leadership of Farseer Caerys arrive in response to the Necron awakening, their ancient enemy.  The Imperial Guard comes under suspicion by the Imperium's Blood Ravens chapter of the Space Marines, and the Sisters of Battle, for suspected heresy. This forces a conflict between the three imperial factions. The Chaos warband of the Alpha Legion arrives using the warpstorm. The Tau arrive, intending to annex the system into the Tau Empire. Finally, the Dark Eldar, usually avoiding large-scale warfare, sees the chaos and confusion of the conflict as an opportunity to capture prisoners and souls.

Several endings exist:

 Chaos: The reason for the Warp Storm is revealed in the Chaos ending to have begun with an ignorant Imperial Guardsman with latent psyker genes who was whispered to by the Chaos Gods, telling him to prepare a ritual. His actions unknowingly summoned the Alpha Legion to the Kaurava System, thus starting the conflict. The Alpha Legion succeeds in turning Kaurava into a staging ground for attacks into the Imperium.
 Imperial Guard: Vance Stubbs clears the Kauravan defenders of suspected heresy. The surviving Blood Ravens and Sisters of Battle are treated after their defeat. The entire system is recolonized, except for Kaurava III, containing the Necrons. Kaurava becomes a system of incredible value to the Imperium.
 Blood Ravens: The Blood Ravens treat the Imperial Guard and Sisters with mercy. They establish Kaurava as a fortress-system, allowing them to use it as a base and recruiting ground.
 Eldar: The Eldar after conquering the system withdraw, but clandestinely remain. The few Imperial Guard survivors manage to rebuild with reinforcements, but the Eldar prevent Kaurava III from being colonized, as to not provoke further Necron awakenings.
 Tau: The Tau establish Kaurava as a great system of importance in the Tau Empire.
 Sisters of Battle: The opposing Imperial forces are executed by the Sisters. They clear the rest of the system and establish Kaurava as a place of pilgrimage within the Imperium.
 Dark Eldar: The Dark Eldar capture incredible numbers of prisoners before departing from the system.
 Orks: Kaurava is conquered and serves as a staging point for a WAAAAGH! under the command of Gorgutz.
 Necrons: Kaurava is overwhelmed profiting from the confusion of the living their enemies died quickly in confusion and terror.

The fate of the Kaurava System depends on the actions taken by the various factions fighting over it, but initially, the only known details on the canonical ending initially came only from dialogue in the sequel, Warhammer 40,000: Dawn of War II. Scout Sergeant Cyrus states that the Kaurava campaign was a failure, and that the majority of the Blood Ravens led by Captain Indrick Boreale were wiped out, costing the chapter half of its manpower in a single campaign. As a result, the severely undermanned Blood Ravens cannot afford to lose their recruiting worlds in sub-sector Aurelia and must defend them at all costs. Dialogue in Warhammer 40,000: Dawn of War III reveals that the Orks led by Gorgutz were indeed the ones who defeated the Blood Ravens under Indrick Boreale and according to a mission briefing, were indeed the ones who conquered the Kaurava system.

Development
Warhammer 40,000: Dawn of War – Soulstorm was developed by Iron Lore Entertainment as the third expansion to the Warhammer 40,000: Dawn of War. On January 13, 2008, Relic released a 1.12 GB demo of Soulstorm on several gaming websites. The demo allows players to play a tutorial, as well as one skirmish and one scenario map as the Dark Eldar. The demo's loading screens also show the new additional flying units added in the expansion. The demo scenario simulates an assault on the Space Marine stronghold if one were playing the Dark Eldar in the campaign game.

On March 4, 2008, Soulstorm was released first on the North American market, some days later everywhere else. After the end of patch support, the game's community continued the support with own made unofficial patches.

Reception

Soulstorm received "mixed or average" reviews, according to review aggregator Metacritic.

Eurogamer gave the game a 6 out of 10, writing, "Dawn of War is still a thrilling, explosive real-time strategy, even if it is now starting to look quite raggedy...[Soulstorm] offers too little, and is without the massively appealing races of previous expansions. GameRevolution rated it similarly and praised its amount of maps, single-player content, multiplayer, and solid performance while also acknowledging the aging graphics and uninteresting new factions. GameSpot and IGN commended the addition of the new factions, setting, aerial units, and atmosphere while taking issue with the lack of innovation and identical feel to the previous year's Dark Crusade campaign. GamesRadar appreciated the changes made to balancing and the solid multiplayer but thought that the campaign was weak and supported by an aging engine.

References

External links 
 Warhammer 40,000: Dawn of War – Soulstorm at MobyGames

2008 video games
Multiplayer and single-player video games
Relic Entertainment games
THQ games
Video games developed in Canada
Video game expansion packs
Video games featuring female protagonists
Video games set on fictional planets
Dawn of War: Soulstorm
Windows games
Windows-only games
Video games developed in the United States